Liars, Leakers, and Liberals: The Case Against the Anti-Trump Conspiracy is a 2018 book authored by Jeanine Pirro, an American TV personality, former judge, prosecutor, district attorney and Republican politician in New York. Pirro was the host of Fox News Channel's Justice with Judge Jeanine.  Liars, Leakers, and Liberals is Pirro's fifth book.

Published by Center Street and released on July 17, 2018, the 288 page book is listed as non-fiction and is a look inside the Presidency of Donald Trump as well as the politics surrounding the anti-Trump movement.  The book's content includes author-conducted interviews with high-ranking administration officials, Trump family members, and those considered White House "insiders". 

Following the book's release, it was listed on the New York Times best-seller list as well as the number one sales slot at Amazon.com.

Promotion tour
Pirro embarked on a promotion tour for Liars, Leakers, and Liberals in July 2018.  The tour comprised book signings as well as interviews, including ABC's daytime talk show, The View.

Appearance on The View
During her appearance and interview on the July 20, 2018 broadcast of The View, Pirro and host Whoopi Goldberg were involved in an on-air exchange characterized later by media as a "heated debate" as well as an "explosive fight".  After Pirro told show host Goldberg that she "suffers from Trump Derangement Syndrome", Goldberg responded by saying, "What's horrible is when the president of the United States whips up people to beat the hell out of people".  Goldberg then telling Pirro "Say goodbye! Bye! I'm done." Appearing on Fox News's commentary show Hannity the following night, Pirro claimed that she "got thrown off the set, thrown out of the building".

References

External links
Listing and review of Liars, Leakers, and Liberals at Conservative Book Club

2018 non-fiction books
Books about politics of the United States
Center Street (publisher) books